Johnny Fletcher is a fictional character created by Frank Gruber. Fletcher is a con-man and reluctant amateur detective. The character was the protagonist of several mystery novels published between 1940 and 1964. Additionally, he was featured in a feature film adaptation scripted by Gruber, and a short lived radio series.

Overview
Fletcher and his sidekick Sam Cragg are small time scam artists. Fletcher is the brains, and the muscular Cragg the brawn. They often stumble upon crimes, and reluctantly end attempting to solve them. They often pose as private detectives.

List of stories

Novels
 The French Key aka Once Over Deadly (1940)
 The Laughing Fox (1940)
 The Hungry Dog aka Die Like a Dog (1941)
 The Navy Colt (1941)
 The Talking Clock (1941)
 The Gift Horse aka Heir to Homicide (1942)
 The Mighty Blockhead aka The Corpse Moved Upstairs (1942)
 The Silver Tombstone aka The Silver Tombstone Mystery (1945)
 The Honest Dealer aka Double Dealer (1947)
 The Whispering Master (1947)
 The Scarlet Feather aka The Gamecock Murder (1948)
 The Leather Duke aka A Job of Murder (1949)
 The Limping Goose (1954)
 The Corpse Moved Upstairs (1964)
 Swing Low Swing Dead (1964)

Short stories
 The Sad Serbian (1939) (features Sam Cragg only)
 The Laughing Fox (1940)

Adaptations

Film
In 1946, Gruber adapted The French Key into a feature film, starring Albert Dekker as Fletcher and Mike Mazurki as Cragg.

Radio series

Johnny Fletcher is an American old-time radio comedy-detective drama. It was broadcast weekly on ABC from May 30, 1948, until November 27, 1948. The program was also known as A Johnny Fletcher Mystery.

Radio historian Jim Cox, in his book, Radio Crime Fighters: Over 300 Programs from the Golden Age, describes Fletcher as "inept" and "frequently drunk". The program's plots usually involved murder or other kinds of mayhem that Fletcher and his partner, Sam Cragg, tried to solve. As an example, "The Whispering Master" episode (previewed in a contemporary newspaper) began with an "unidentified but beautiful young woman" kissing Fletcher and suddenly departing, leaving behind a popular recording. As the plot unfolded, Fletcher had to solve the murder of the singer who recorded the song.

Gruber originally sold the rights to his Fletcher novels to NBC in 1946. An audition recording of Johnny Fletcher Mysteries featured Albert Dekker as Fletcher and Mike Mazurki as Sam, reprising their roles from the film version of The French Key. The pilot episode was an adaptation of the novel, The Navy Colt. Two years later, ABC bought the rights to the program from NBC and produced Johnny Fletcher.

On the ABC version, Fletcher was portrayed by Bill Goodwin, while Sam was played by Sheldon Leonard. The announcers were Owen James and John Storm. Gruber wrote the scripts, and Buzz Adlam provided the music. Producers were Bill Rousseau and Hal Finberg.

The February 20, 1961, issue of the trade magazine Broadcasting included Johnny Fletcher in a list of pilots being prepared for the 1961-1962 season. Gruber was the producer of the episode, which starred Johnny Goddard and Read Morgan.

Television
Gruber wrote an episode of the anthology series Suspense entitled 1000 To One. Paul Stewart appeared as the Sam Cragg character. Fletcher did not appear.

References 
 

1948 radio programme debuts
1948 radio programme endings
ABC radio programs
Detective radio shows
Fletcher, Johnny